Florin Pucă (April 24, 1932 — February 23, 1990) was a Romanian graphic artist. He was also a close collaborator of Leonid Dimov's, having illustrated several of his literary works. Other writers Pucă illustrated for include Gheorghe Pituṭ, Mircea Micu, Nichita Stănescu, Petre Stoica, Ion Băieşu and Modest Morariu.

Filmography
 as actor 
 Tatăl risipitor (1974)
 Mușchetarul român (1975)
 Red Apples (1976)
 Toate pînzele sus (serial TV, 1977) - ep. 1, 4-5
 Iancu Jianu, haiducul (1981)
 Ștefan Luchian  (1981)

References

External links
 

1932 births
1990 deaths
Romanian artists
Romanian male film actors
Romanian male television actors